The Asian Men's Handball Championship is the official competition for senior national handball teams of Asia (since 2018, also includes teams from Oceania), and takes place every two years. In addition to crowning the Asian champions, International Handball Federation (IHF) and Asian Handball Federation (AHF) the tournament also serves as a qualifying tournament for the World Championship.

Summary

Medal table

Participating nations

See also 
Asian Men's Junior Handball Championship
Asian Men's Youth Handball Championship
Asian Women's Handball Championship
Asian Women's Junior Handball Championship
Asian Women's Youth Handball Championship

External links
Asian Handball Federation
Archives at Todor66.com

 
Handball
Men's sports competitions in Asia
Recurring sporting events established in 1977